Local elections were held in Romania on 1 June 2008, with a runoff for mayors on 15 June 2008.

On 1 June elections were held for:
 all the villages, communes, cities, and municipal councils (Local Councils), and the Sectors Local Councils of Bucharest
 the 41 County Councils, and the Bucharest Municipal General Council.
 the 41 Presidents of the County Councils
 all the mayors
 of the villages, cities, and municipalities 
 of the Sectors of Bucharest
 The General Mayor of The Municipality of Bucharest

On 17 April 2008, the Social Democratic Party and the Conservative Party announced they would form a political alliance for these elections, the Alliance PSD+PC. For the first time the presidents of the County Councils were elected directly by the people, and not by later negotiations inside the County Council; other notable characteristics included a substantial number of Roma candidates standing, as well as some representatives of the Romanian Orthodox Church. Turnout was low, with fewer than half of the eligible voters turning out to vote; in most big cities, except for Constanţa (incumbent PSD member Radu Ştefan Mazăre won) and Cluj-Napoca (incumbent Democratic Liberal Party member Emil Boc won), the election was not decided in the first round; in Bucharest, PDL member Vasile Blaga and independent Sorin Oprescu (former member of the PSD) will meet in the run-off.

Overall, PD-L got 28.37%, PSD got 28.04%, PNL got 18.66%, and UDMR got 5.43% of the cast votes.

First round

Mayors

The most notables victories of the election ("Top 10") are listed below:

Local Councils

County Council Presidents

County Councils

Runoff

The mayoral runoff was held in 1,441 local constituencies. Also, in the communes of Ştefăneşti and Vidra, in Ilfov County the first tour was repeated, due to the cancellation of the election held on 1 June in the two communes. If a runoff is needed for the mayor's election, it will be held on 24 June. A sentence regarding the cancellation of the electoral process in the commune of Iepureşti, Giurgiu is pending from the Central Electoral Bureau.

The independent and former  member Sorin Oprescu won the election for mayor of Bucharest with 54% against Vasile Blaga from the president's . Overall,  won about a third of the mayors, while  won slightly less.

|- style="background-color:#C9C9C9"
!style="background-color:#E9E9E9;text-align:center;" colspan=2 rowspan=2 |Party
!style="background-color:#E9E9E9;text-align:center;" colspan=3 |County CouncilsPresidents
!style="background-color:#E9E9E9;text-align:center;" colspan=3 |Mayors
!style="background-color:#E9E9E9;text-align:center;" colspan=3 |Local Councilsseats (CL)
!style="background-color:#E9E9E9;text-align:center;" colspan=3 |County Councilseats (CJ)
|- style="background-color:#C9C9C9"
!style="background-color:#E9E9E9;text-align:center;" |Votes
!style="background-color:#E9E9E9;text-align:center;" |%
!style="background-color:#E9E9E9;text-align:center;" |Seats
!style="background-color:#E9E9E9;text-align:center;" |Votes
!style="background-color:#E9E9E9;text-align:center;" |%
!style="background-color:#E9E9E9;text-align:center;" |Seats
!style="background-color:#E9E9E9;text-align:center;" |Votes
!style="background-color:#E9E9E9;text-align:center;" |%
!style="background-color:#E9E9E9;text-align:center;" |Seats
!style="background-color:#E9E9E9;text-align:center;" |Votes
!style="background-color:#E9E9E9;text-align:center;" |%
!style="background-color:#E9E9E9;text-align:center;" |Seats
|-
| 
| style="text-align:left;" |   (Partidul Democrat Liberal)
| style="text-align:right;" | 2,243,144
| style="text-align:right;" | 28.17
| style="text-align:right;" | 14
| style="text-align:right;" | 2,964,948
| style="text-align:right;" | 33.58
| style="text-align:right;" | 908
| style="text-align:right;" | 2,356,584
| style="text-align:right;" | 27.70
| style="text-align:right;" | 11,129
| style="text-align:right;" | 2,416,014
| style="text-align:right;" | 28.92
| style="text-align:right;" | 458
|-
| 
| style="text-align:left;" |  (Partidul Social Democrat)
| style="text-align:right;" | 2,234,465
| style="text-align:right;" | 28.06
| style="text-align:right;" | 17
| style="text-align:right;" | 2,717,490
| style="text-align:right;" | 30.77
| style="text-align:right;" | 1,138
| style="text-align:right;" | 2,268,271
| style="text-align:right;" | 26.67
| style="text-align:right;" | 12,137
| style="text-align:right;" | 2,337,102
| style="text-align:right;" | 27.97
| style="text-align:right;" | 452
|-
| 
| style="text-align:left;" |   (Partidul Naţional Liberal)
| style="text-align:right;" | 1,537,840
| style="text-align:right;" | 18.08
| style="text-align:right;" | 5
| style="text-align:right;" | 1,721,834
| style="text-align:right;" | 19.50
| style="text-align:right;" | 706
| style="text-align:right;" | 1,576,214
| style="text-align:right;" | 19.80
| style="text-align:right;" | 8,529
| style="text-align:right;" | 1,521,191
| style="text-align:right;" | 18.20
| style="text-align:right;" | 297
|-
| 
| style="text-align:left;" | Democratic Alliance of Hungarians in Romania  (Uniunea Democrată Maghiară din România)
| style="text-align:right;" | 419,028
| style="text-align:right;" | 5.26
| style="text-align:right;" | 4
| style="text-align:right;" | 378,413
| style="text-align:right;" | 4.28
| style="text-align:right;" | 184
| style="text-align:right;" | 404,657
| style="text-align:right;" | 4.75
| style="text-align:right;" | 2,195
| style="text-align:right;" | 429,329
| style="text-align:right;" | 5.13
| style="text-align:right;" | 89
|-
| 
| style="text-align:left;" |   (Partidul Conservator)
| style="text-align:right;" | 263,200
| style="text-align:right;" | 3.30
| style="text-align:right;" | –
| style="text-align:right;" | 224,182
| style="text-align:right;" | 2.53
| style="text-align:right;" | 47
| style="text-align:right;" | 315,825
| style="text-align:right;" | 3.71
| style="text-align:right;" | 1,398
| style="text-align:right;" | 277,492
| style="text-align:right;" | 3.32
| style="text-align:right;" | 16
|-
| 
| style="text-align:left;" |   (Partidul Noua Generaţie - Creştin Democrat)
| style="text-align:right;" | 227,744
| style="text-align:right;" | 2.86
| style="text-align:right;" | –
| style="text-align:right;" | 159,739
| style="text-align:right;" | 1.80
| style="text-align:right;" | 35
| style="text-align:right;" | 300,661
| style="text-align:right;" | 3.53
| style="text-align:right;" | 1,203
| style="text-align:right;" | 248,757
| style="text-align:right;" | 2.97
| style="text-align:right;" | 9
|-
| 
| style="text-align:left;" |   (Partidul România Mare)
| style="text-align:right;" | 252,956
| style="text-align:right;" | 3.17
| style="text-align:right;" | –
| style="text-align:right;" | 124,492
| style="text-align:right;" | 1.41
| style="text-align:right;" | 19
| style="text-align:right;" | 314,731
| style="text-align:right;" | 3.70
| style="text-align:right;" | 1,090
| style="text-align:right;" | 313,666
| style="text-align:right;" | 3.75
| style="text-align:right;" | 15
|-
| 
| style="text-align:left;" | Christian Democratic National Peasants' Party  (Partidul Naţional Ţărănesc Creştin Democrat)
| style="text-align:right;" | 78,752
| style="text-align:right;" | 0.98
| style="text-align:right;" | –
| style="text-align:right;" | 53,908
| style="text-align:right;" | 0.61
| style="text-align:right;" | 11
| style="text-align:right;" | 102,137
| style="text-align:right;" | 1.20
| style="text-align:right;" | 326
| style="text-align:right;" | 88,066
| style="text-align:right;" | 1.05
| style="text-align:right;" | 2
|-
| 
| style="text-align:left;" | Other political parties
| style="text-align:right;" | 703,437
| style="text-align:right;" | 10.12
| style="text-align:right;" | 1
| style="text-align:right;" | 502,202
| style="text-align:right;" | 5.52
| style="text-align:right;" | 131
| style="text-align:right;" | 865,707
| style="text-align:right;" | 8.94
| style="text-align:right;" | 2,260
| style="text-align:right;" | 722,134
| style="text-align:right;" | 8,69
| style="text-align:right;" | 55
|-
| style="text-align:left;" colspan=2 | Total:  18,313,440 expected voters (turnout 49,38%)
! style="text-align:right;" | 7,960,566
! style="text-align:right;" | 100
! style="text-align:right;" | 41
! style="text-align:right;" | 8,829,208
! style="text-align:right;" | 100
! style="text-align:right;" | 3,179
! style="text-align:right;" | 8,504,787
! style="text-align:right;" | 100
! style="text-align:right;" | 40,297
! style="text-align:right;" | 8,353,751
! style="text-align:right;" | 100
! style="text-align:right;" | 1,393
|-
| style="text-align:left;" colspan=14 | Source: Central Electoral Bureau 
|}

Notable partial election

The legislature of the local authorities is of four years, for all the local authorities. Local elected officials who cannot serve the full term (due to death, incompatibility or resignation) are replaced. The members of the Local Councils and County Councils are replaced by the next person on the list elected. For the Mayors and Presidents of the County Councils, elected on a two-round system, and first past the post respectively, no later than 90 days from the vacancy of the post the Government must announce the day the early election is called. The election is not called if the vacancy occurs in the last six months of the term. The newly elected Mayors and Presidents of the County Councils serve the rest of the term. The ad interim Mayors and Presidents of the County Councils are one of the Deputy-Mayors (elected by the Local Council, if the settlement has more than one Deputy-Mayor), and one of the Vice President of the County Council, elected by the County Council.

Cluj-Napoca 
On 22 December 2008 Emil Boc was sworn in as Prime Minister of Romania. He resigned from the office of Mayor of Cluj-Napoca on 4 January 2009. The Government called for partial election in Cluj-Napoca on 15 February 2009. The three main competitors were the ad interim Mayor of Cluj-Napoca, Sorin Apostu (PD-L), former Cluj County Council President and current Senator Marius Nicoară (PNL), and former Cluj-Napoca Police commander, Teodor Pop-Puşcaş (PSD).

References 

Local election, 2008
Local election, 2008
2008 elections in Romania
June 2008 events in Europe